Bandja Sy (born July 30, 1990) is a Malian-French professional basketball player for Metropolitans 92 of the LNB Pro A. Standing at 2.04  m (6'8"), he plays the small forward and  power forward positions. After playing four years of college basketball at New Mexico State Sy entered the 2013 NBA draft, but he was not selected in the draft's two rounds.

High school career
Sy joined the Aggies after the 2008-09 season at Stoneridge Prep in Simi Valley, California. He averaged 18 points and four rebounds a game. Sy attended the Adidas National Tournament in the summer of 2008 and 2009. At the Douais Tournament, he was named the best wing player and played in the all-star game. In August 2007, Sy was selected to attend the Basketball without Borders Europe in Paris, France. The NBA and FIBA conduct the camp as part of the NBA’s global basketball development and community outreach program.

College career

New Mexico State
Sy played college basketball at New Mexico State University, with the New Mexico State Aggies, from 2009 to 2013. As a freshman, Sy was a role player, appearing in 15 games for the Aggies. He averaged 1.5 points and 0.9 rebounds per game. As a sophomore, Sy played in all 33 games and started in 20 contests for the Aggies averaging 4.7 points and 2.7 rebounds per game. In his third season in the Crimson and White, Sy played in all 36 games and started in two contests. He averaged 8.8 points and 4.0 rebounds per game and shot 45.5 percent from the field and 32.8 percent from the 3-point line. In his final season with the Aggies, Sy was a first team All-WAC honoree. He led the Aggies in rebounding with 7.3 rebounds per game and was second on the squad in scoring with 11.9 points per game. Sy was the only Aggie to start in all 35 games in 2012-13.

Professional career
After going undrafted in the 2014 NBA draft, Sy returned to France and joined Élan Béarnais Pau-Orthez of the LNB Pro A. During his rookie season, Sy averaged 5.8 points and 3.8 rebounds in 18.3 minutes per game. After one season, he left Orthez and joined SLUC Nancy. He stayed with the team for two seasons, playing in 33 games and averaging 8.2 points and 4.3 rebounds per game.

On June 24, 2016, he joined ASVEL Basket of the LNB Pro A and of the Champions League. With ASVEL, at LNB Pro A, he averaged 5.7 points and 2.8 rebounds per game and 8 points and 3.5 rebounds per game at Champions League, being one of the most spectacular players due to his amazing dunks.

On September 15, 2017, Sy left ASVEL and joined AEK Athens of the Greek Basket League, replacing Cleanthony Early on the teams squad who left the due to disciplinary reasons. On January 17, 2018, he left AEK and signed with Serbian club Partizan for the rest of the 2017–18 season. On March 2, Sy has signed a new contract until summer 2019.

On August 11, 2021, he has signed with Metropolitans 92 of the LNB Pro A.

Career statistics

Domestic Leagues

Regular season

|-
| 2017–18
| style="text-align:left;"| A.E.K.
| align=center | GBL
| 18 || 21.7 || .461 || .333 || .667 || 2.0 || 0 || 0.3 || 0.3 || 5.0
|}

FIBA Champions League

|-
| style="text-align:left;" | 2016–17
| style="text-align:left;" | ASVEL
| 18 || 21.7 || .519 || .348 || .567 || 3.6 || .9 || .8 || .3 || 8.1
|-
| style="text-align:left;" | 2017–18
| style="text-align:left;" | A.E.K.
| 5 || 7.6 || .375 || .000 || .000 || 1.2 || 0 || .6 || 0 || 1.2
|}

Career achievements and awards

Club 
 Serbian Cup winner: 2 (with Partizan NIS: 2017–18, 2018-19)

References

External links
 Bandja Sy at aba-liga.com
 Bandja Sy at basketball-reference.com
 Bandja Sy at eurobasket.com

1990 births
Living people
ABA League players
AEK B.C. players
ASVEL Basket players
Basketball League of Serbia players
Basketball players from Paris
BC Andorra players
Expatriate basketball people in Andorra
Élan Béarnais players
French expatriate basketball people in Serbia
French expatriate basketball people in the United States
French men's basketball players
French people of Malian descent
KK Partizan players
Liga ACB players
Malian expatriate basketball people in Serbia
Malian men's basketball players
Metropolitans 92 players
New Mexico State Aggies men's basketball players
SLUC Nancy Basket players
Small forwards